Nioella is a genus of bacteria in the family of Rhodobacteraceae.

References

Rhodobacteraceae
Bacteria genera